Muhlenbergia sericea, synonym Muhlenbergia filipes, known as gulf hairawn muhly or sweet grass, is a species of grass in the family Poaceae. It is native to the Southeastern United States (Alabama, Florida, Georgia, Louisiana, Mississippi, North Carolina, South Carolina, and Texas).

Description
Sweetgrass is a perennial grass. Most of the growth happens during spring and summer. The foliage is yellow-green. In the autumn, it produces large (30–70 cm long by 20–30 cm wide) effuse inflorescences (clusters on a stalk) of tiny red and purple spikelets (the type of flower seen in grasses). It produces purple seeds weight about a third of a milligram. Propagation is by seed or sprigging.

Sweetgrass is neither shade tolerant or drought tolerant, but it is fire tolerant and salt-tolerant.

Uses

Seminole basketry
Among Florida's Seminole Indians, sweetgrass was the most commonly used material for basket weaving. These baskets were often sold in tourist gift shops. In recent years, sweetgrass is becoming harder to find in South Florida. It is now only harvested during certain times of the year and in just a few locations.

African American arts
This grass has historical importance in South Carolina, where it has been used for basket weaving. African Americans from the Gullah tradition in the South Carolina Lowcountry still weave artistic baskets using this native grass.

References

sericea
Grasses of the United States
Flora of the Southeastern United States
South Carolina culture
Garden plants of North America
Drought-tolerant plants
Flora without expected TNC conservation status